

See also 
 North Carolina's 7th congressional district special election, 1808
 United States House of Representatives elections, 1808 and 1809
 List of United States representatives from North Carolina

1808
North Carolina
United States House of Representatives